In organic chemistry, acroleinide is a functional group which is composed of a cyclic ketal of a diol with acrolein. In pharmaceutical chemistry, it is present in acrocinonide (triamcinolone acroleinide).

See also
 Acetonide
 Acetophenide
 Aminobenzal
 Cyclopentanonide
 Pentanonide

References